Homecoming is an album by Art Farmer recorded in the summer of 1971 and originally released on the Mainstream label.

Reception

Ken Dryden of AllMusic states, "Not an essential album in the vast Farmer discography, but worth acquiring if found at a reasonable price, though it will be difficult".

Track listing
 "Homecoming" (Art Farmer) – 4:06
 "Cascavelo" (Horst Mühlbradt) – 8:39
 "Some Other Time" (Leonard Bernstein) – 5:53
 "Blue Bossa" (Kenny Dorham) – 6:47
 "Here's That Rainy Day" (Johnny Burke, Jimmy Van Heusen) – 6:26

Personnel
Art Farmer – flugelhorn
Jimmy Heath – tenor saxophone, soprano saxophone, flute
Cedar Walton – piano
Sam Jones – bass
Billy Higgins – drums
Mtume – congas
Warren Smith – percussion

References 

Mainstream Records albums
Art Farmer albums
1971 albums
Albums produced by Bob Shad